The Georgian bitterling (Rhodeus colchicus) is a temperate freshwater fish belonging to the subfamily Acheilognathinae of the family Cyprinidae.  It originates in the western portion of the Transcaucasia region of Georgia.  It was originally described by Bogutskaya & Komlev in 2001.  It reaches a maximum size of 6.8 cm (2.7 in).

References 

Georgian bitterling
Fish of Georgia (country)
Georgian bitterling